The Arunachal Dragon Force (ADF), also known as the East India Liberation Front, is a violent secessionist movement in the eastern state of Arunachal Pradesh. The ADF seeks to create an independent Sovereign state resembling the British Teola Country consisting of area currently in Arunachal Pradesh as well as neighboring Assam.

It is also alleged that these people are sponsored by some tainted politicians of Arunachal Pradesh. The self-styled "commander-in-chief" of this group was beaten up  in some local jail in Arunachal Pradesh back in late 1990s and thereafter nothing has been heard about the group.

See also
 Insurgent groups in Northeast India
 Insurgency in North-East India
 Gorkha National Liberation Front
 Compact Revolutionary Zone

External links
ADF at the South Asia Terrorism Portal

Organisations based in Arunachal Pradesh
Paramilitary organisations based in India
Independence movements
Separatism in India
Year of establishment missing